Blake Thomas Lalli (born May 12, 1983) is an American former professional baseball player and current manager for the Reno Aces, the Triple-A affiliate of the Arizona Diamondbacks. He  played in Major League Baseball (MLB) for the Chicago Cubs, Milwaukee Brewers, and the Atlanta Braves.

Playing career

Amateur
Lalli graduated from Pine-Richland High School in Gibsonia, Pennsylvania, in 2001. He attended Gardner–Webb University from 2002 through 2006, where he played for the school's baseball team. Lalli was named to the All-Atlantic Sun Conference's first team as a third baseman in 2005 and as a catcher in 2006. In 2005, he played collegiate summer baseball with the Harwich Mariners of the Cape Cod Baseball League.

Chicago Cubs
Undrafted out of college, Lalli signed with the Chicago Cubs as a free agent in 2006. He was named a Southern League All-Star in 2009, 2010, and 2011. The Cubs promoted Lalli to MLB on May 18, 2012, and he made his MLB debut that day. He became the first GWU alumnus to appear in MLB.

Oakland Athletics
On August 27, 2012, the Athletics acquired Lalli from the Chicago Cubs in exchange for catcher Anthony Recker.

Milwaukee Brewers
On November 14, 2012, the Milwaukee Brewers signed Lalli to a minor league contract and invited him to spring training. On April 9, 2013, Lalli's contract was purchased and he was added to the Major League roster by the Brewers. He was designated for assignment on September 19, 2013 and became a free agent on October 1.

Arizona Diamondbacks
Lalli signed a minor league deal with the Arizona Diamondbacks in October 2013.  He became a minor league free agent after the 2014 season and on November 26, 2014, he signed a minor league deal to return with the team.

Atlanta Braves
On September 11, 2016, Lalli was called up from AAA Gwinnett Braves to the Atlanta Braves. He was released on May 13, 2017.

Second Stint With Diamondbacks
On June 7, 2017, Lalli signed a minor league deal with the Arizona Diamondbacks.

Managerial career

Kane County Cougars
For the 2018 season, Lalli was named the manager for the Kane County Cougars, the single-A affiliate of the Diamondbacks.

Jackson Generals
After one year in the Chicago suburbs, he left to become manager of the Jackson Generals for the 2019 season. In one season with the Generals, Lalli led the team to their third championship in the last four seasons in the Southern League.

Reno Aces
On February 1, 2021, Lalli was announced as the new manager for the Reno Aces. He became the youngest manager in Aces history and first to be a former player.

Personal
Lalli resides in Boiling Springs, North Carolina during the baseball offseason.

References

External links

1983 births
Living people
People from Richland Township, Allegheny County, Pennsylvania
Baseball coaches from Pennsylvania
Baseball players from Pennsylvania
Major League Baseball catchers
Chicago Cubs players
Milwaukee Brewers players
Atlanta Braves players
Gardner–Webb Runnin' Bulldogs baseball players
Harwich Mariners players
Iowa Cubs players
Boise Hawks players
Peoria Chiefs players
Daytona Cubs players
Tennessee Smokies players
Caribes de Anzoátegui players
Sacramento River Cats players
Nashville Sounds players
Reno Aces players
Gwinnett Braves players
Pine-Richland High School alumni
Sportspeople from the Pittsburgh metropolitan area
People from Boiling Springs, North Carolina
Minor league baseball managers
American expatriate baseball players in Venezuela